Yoon Hye-ran (born 1969) is a leader working to enable Cheonan’s civil society to exercise its social responsibilities dynamically and democratically. She was awarded the Ramon Magsaysay Award in 2005.

References

South Korean women
Living people
1969 births